Statistics of Scottish Football League in season 1968/1969.

Scottish League Division One

Scottish League Division Two

 
Scottish Football League seasons